Wolf Lake is an American supernatural drama television series that originally aired on CBS from September 19 to October 24, 2001. Nine episodes were produced, but only five aired before the series was canceled by CBS. The full series, including the four unaired episodes, was later picked up and broadcast on UPN in April–May 2002.  Wolf Lake depicts a pack of werewolves living in a Seattle suburb.

Summary
Seattle policeman John Kanin proposes marriage to his girlfriend, Ruby Wilder, and she accepts. However, as she gets into her car, she is attacked. The only thing Kanin finds of his now fiancee, is a severed hand. He travels to her hometown of Wolf Lake to find some answers. However, his experiences there raise even more questions. What John doesn't know is that some of the inhabitants of Wolf Lake are actually werewolves. The werewolves, or the ones who survive the change, live on the "Hill" and enjoy special treatment, separated from the normal humans.

Cast

Main
 Lou Diamond Phillips as Detective/Officer John Kanin
 Tim Matheson as Sheriff Matthew "Matt" Donner
 Graham Greene as Mr. Sherman Blackstone
 Mary Elizabeth Winstead as Sophia Donner
 Sharon Lawrence as Vivian "V" Cates
 Scott Bairstow as Tyler Creed
 Mia Kirshner as Ruby Wilder/Cates/Creed
 Paul Wasilewski as Lucas "Luke" Cates

Recurring
 Bruce McGill as Willard "Will" Cates
 Kellie Waymire as Miranda Devereaux
 Fiona Scott as Presley
 Carmen Moore as Deputy Molly
 Christian Bocher as Buddy Hooks

Guest stars

 Bill Mondy
 Gregory Itzin
 Sam Anderson
 Levi James
 Craig Olejnik
 Sarah Carter
 Ralph J. Alderman
 Craig Bruhnanski
 Steve Makaj
 Kelly Dean Sereda
 Deanne Henry
 Ryan Robbins
 Jodelle Ferland

Episodes
The first five episodes of Wolf Lake aired on CBS in September–October 2001, before CBS pulled the series from the air. The series later was reaired on UPN, with the final four episodes debuting on UPN in April–May 2002.

Broadcast
ITV bought the rights to show the series in the United Kingdom. In August 2006, the Sci Fi Channel bought the syndication rights to reair the series in the United States.

Home media
The series was made available on DVD in 2012.

Reception
While Ron Wertheimer of The New York Times said it was "a promisingly quirky pilot", Varietys Michael Speier remarked that it "sometimes works as high drama but sometimes comes off as extremely silly".

While the series was poorly rated, it received two Emmy nominations, for Outstanding Main Title Design and Outstanding Main Title Theme Music.

References

External links
 
 
 At Revolution Scifi

2000s American drama television series
2001 American television series debuts
2001 American television series endings
CBS original programming
English-language television shows
Television series by CBS Studios
Television shows filmed in Vancouver
Television shows set in Washington (state)
Television about werewolves
Unfinished creative works